Colonel Rafael Tomás Fernández is a Santo Domingo Metro station on Line 2. It was open on 1 April 2013 as part of the inaugural section of Line 2 between María Montez and Eduardo Brito. The station is located between Juan Pablo Duarte and Mauricio Báez.

This is an underground station built below Avenida John F. Kennedy and Expreso V Centenario. It is named in honor of Rafael Tomás Fernández.

References

Santo Domingo Metro stations
2013 establishments in the Dominican Republic
Railway stations opened in 2013